Abū Amr Ḥafṣ ibn Sulaymān ibn al-Mughīrah ibn Abi Dawud al-Asadī al-Kūfī, better known as Hafs (706–796 CE; 90–180 AH according to the Islamic calendar), was one of the primary transmitters of one of the seven canonical methods of Qur'an recitation (qira'at). His method via his teacher Aasim ibn Abi al-Najud has become the most popular method across the majority of the Muslim world.

In addition to being the student of Aasim, Hafs was also his son-in-law. Having been born in Baghdad, Hafs eventually moved to Mecca where he popularized his father-in-law's recitation method.

Eventually, Hafs' recitation of Aasim's method was made the official method of Egypt, having been formally adopted as the standard Egyptian printing of the Qur'an under the auspices of Fuad I of Egypt in 1923. The majority of copies of the Quran today follow the reading of Hafs. In North and West Africa there is a bigger tendency to follow the reading of Warsh.

Hafs recitation 

Of all the canonical recitation traditions, only the Kufan tradition of Hafs included the bismillah as a separate verse in Chapter (surah) 1.

In the 10thC, in his Kitāb al-sabʿa fī l-qirāʾāt, Ibn Mujahid established seven readings of the Quran which would later be known as the canonical 'Seven'. Three of their readers hailed from Kufa, a centre of early Islamic learning. The three Kufan readers were Al-Kisa'i, the Kufan; Hamzah az-Zaiyyat; and Aasim ibn Abi al-Najud.

It is, alongside the Hafs 'an 'Asim tradition which represents the recitational tradition of Kufa, one of the two major oral transmission of the Quran in the Muslim World. The influential standard Quran of Cairo that was published in 1924 is based on Hafs 'an ʻAsim's recitation.

Chain of Transmission 
Imam Hafs ibn Suleiman ibn al-Mughirah al-Asadi al-Kufi learned from Aasim ibn Abi al-Najud al-Kufi al-Tabi'i from Abu 'Abd al-Rahman al-Sulami from Uthman ibn Affan, Ali, Ubayy ibn Ka'b, and Zaid ibn Thabit from Muhammad.

See also 
Khalaf al-Bazzar

Ijazah

References

706 births
796 deaths
8th-century Arabs
Quranic readings
People from Mecca
People from Baghdad
People from Kufa
Iraqi Sunni Muslims